Paracapperia esuriens is a moth of the family Pterophoridae that is known from Ethiopia, the Democratic Republic of the Congo and Angola.

References

Oxyptilini
Moths described in 1932
Insects of the Democratic Republic of the Congo
Insects of Angola
Insects of Ethiopia
Moths of Africa
Taxa named by Edward Meyrick